Stanley may refer to:

Arts and entertainment

Film and television
 Stanley (1972 film), an American horror film 
 Stanley (1984 film), an Australian comedy
 Stanley (1999 film), an animated short
 Stanley (1956 TV series), an American situation comedy
 Stanley (2001 TV series), an American animated series

Other uses in arts and entertainment
 Stanley (play), by Pam Gems, 1996
 Stanley Award, an Australian Cartoonists' Association award
 Stanley: The Search for Dr. Livingston, a video game
 Stanley (Cars), a character in Cars Toons: Mater's Tall Tales
 The Stanley Parable, a 2011 video game developed by Galactic Cafe, and its titular character, Stanley

Businesses and organisations
 Stanley, Inc., American information technology company
 Stanley Aviation, American aerospace company
 Stanley Black & Decker, formerly The Stanley Works, American hardware manufacturer
 Stanley knife, a utility knife
 Stanley bottle, a brand of food and beverage containers
 Stanley Electric, a Japanese manufacturer of electric lights
 Stanley Furniture, American furniture manufacturer
 The Stanley Hotel, in Estes Park, Colorado, U.S.
 Stanley Hotel, Nairobi, Kenya
 Stanley Medical College, Madras, Tamil Nadu, India
 Stanley Motor Carriage Company, American manufacturer of steam cars
 Stanley Steemer, American cleaning company 
 Stanley Theater (disambiguation), several places

People
 Stanley (name), a given name and family name, including a list of people and fictional characters
 Stanley (Brazilian footballer) (born 1985), born Stanley Richieri Afonso, Brazilian footballer

Places

Australia 
 Stanley, Tasmania
 Stanley, Victoria
 County of Stanley, Queensland

Canada 
 Stanley, British Columbia
 Rural Municipality of Stanley, Manitoba
 Rural Municipality of Stanley No. 215, Saskatchewan
 Stanley, New Brunswick
 Stanley Parish, New Brunswick
 Stanley, Nova Scotia
 Port Stanley, Ontario

United Kingdom 
 Stanley, Derbyshire, England
 Stanley, County Durham, England
 Stanley Crook, County Durham, England
 Stanley, Nottinghamshire, England
 Stanley, Staffordshire, England
 Stanley, West Yorkshire, England
 Stanley, Wiltshire, England
 Stanley, Perthshire, Scotland

United States 
 Stanley, Idaho
 Stanley, Indiana
 Stanley, Iowa
 Stanley, Kansas
 Stanley, Kentucky
 Stanley, Louisiana
 Stanley, Minnesota
 Stanley, New Mexico
 Stanley, New York
 Stanley, North Carolina
 Stanley, North Dakota
 Stanley, Oklahoma
 Stanley, Virginia
 Stanley, West Virginia
 Stanley, Wisconsin, in Chippewa County
 Stanley, Barron County, Wisconsin
 Stanley County, South Dakota
 Stanley Lake, in Custer County, Idaho
 Stanley Township, Lyon County, Minnesota
 Camp Stanley (Texas), U.S. Army installation in Texas
 Fox Chase Farm, in Philadelphia, Pennsylvania, listed on the NRHP as "Stanley", a former name

Other countries 
 Stanley (neighborhood), in Alexandria, Egypt
 Stanley, Falkland Islands
 Stanley (constituency)
 Stanley, Hong Kong
 Camp Stanley, South Korea
 Mount Stanley, in Democratic Republic of the Congo and Uganda

Sports 
 Accrington Stanley F.C., English football club
 Stanley Cup, championship trophy of the National Hockey League in North America
 Stanley Football Association, former Australian rules football competition

Transportation 
 Port Stanley Airport, Falkland Islands
 Stanley Airport, Nova Scotia, Canada
 Stanley (vehicle),  an autonomous car created by Stanford Racing Team
 Stanley Steamer, an American automobile produced by the Stanley Motor Carriage Company
 Stanley (boat), an Icelandic fishing boat c. 1860
 , a London and North Western Railway paddle steamer

See also

 Stan Lee (disambiguation)
 Stanley Park (disambiguation)
 Stanley Peak (disambiguation)
 Stanley River (disambiguation)
 Stanley station (disambiguation)
 Stanly, a surname
 Morgan Stanley, an American multinational investment management and financial services company 
 Owen Stanley Range, mountain range in Papua New Guinea
 Stanley v. Georgia, a U.S. Supreme Court decision
 Stanley v. Illinois, a U.S. Supreme Court decision
 Sten & Stanley, a Swedish dansband